Jafarabad (also Romanized as Ja‘farābād) is a village in Khobriz Rural District, in the Central District of Arsanjan County, Fars Province, Iran. At the 2006 census, its population was 204, in 40 families.

References 

Populated places in Arsanjan County